In 2000 and 2003, professional explorer Phil Buck led multiple international teams across the Pacific Ocean from South America to Easter Island via two separate ancient style reed rafts in an aim to prove that South American mariners could have reached Easter Island. Both vessels were constructed from four Andean materials; totora reeds, natural fiber rope, cotton sails and wood.

The Viracocha I Expedition 
Inspired by explorer Thor Heyerdahl before his death, Buck's plan was to support the theory that ancient South American voyagers crossed vast ocean expanses in various types of boats including the ancient style reed raft that were quite possibly the key factor of human migration and the spread of civilization. The expedition set sail from Arica, Chile and completed the voyage to Easter Island, Polynesia in 44 days in 2000. It was the first primitive boat of any kind to reach the island in modern times.

Controversy 
Kitín Muñoz, the leader of previous Pacific reed boat expeditions, criticized Viracocha in the press, claiming that the use of synthetic rope in the boat construction made the experiment invalid. According to the  builders, they did use a small amount of synthetic twine, but judged that the effect on the durability of the boat was negligible.

The Viracocha II Expedition 

In March 2003, a team of eight men, again led by Phil Buck, set sail from Vina del Mar, Chile aboard a completely new reed raft, the Viracocha II, in an attempt to sail 10,000 nautical miles across the entire Pacific Ocean to Cairns, Australia, via Easter Island and other islands of Polynesia. The raft was severely damaged during the launch and the team was unable to test the raft to its full potential. Even with the starboard side damage, the raft still managed to make the long traverse to Easter Island for the second time.

Reed rafts 
Raft building is one of the oldest maritime technologies. Throughout history, reed rafts have been constructed in almost every part of the world where reeds have grown, most notably in regions near the Mediterranean, in South America and Easter Island. Today only a handful of places still practice the ancient art of reed raft construction. The Aymara reed boat builders of Bolivia's Lake Titicaca are the foremost builders in the world today, having built the hulls of Viracocha I and II. The art of reed boat building has been passed down through generations and survives on both the Peruvian and Bolivian sides of the lake.

Construction of the Reed Rafts
Two and half million reeds were required for each boat and were harvested from the shores of the Bolivian/ Peruvian high altitude Lake Titicaca, where the totora reeds grow in abundance. The reeds were cut with a long cutting pole from small rowboat and bundled up into "amaros" (bundles) with roughly 500 reeds per bundle. They are rowed ashore and sun dried for two to four weeks with bundles stacked together in a standing position. After the drying process, the reeds are gathered up and stored, being careful to keep them from the rain. The reeds (Scirpus Riparius) are generally one half inch thick at the base (before being compressed) and 6 feet long.

The reeds are then made into over 30 long cylinders or "chorizos",  in diameter which are made the length of the boat. These form the main bulk of the ship. The jig is built next. This serves as a mold, constructed with eucalyptus poles every three feet, running perpendicular to the hull supported by poles from the ground. Two smaller boats that looked similar to "whales" are made to add rigidity to the boat with the technique the same as main hull, described later. They are laid side by side on top of the mold. The roles are laid on top of the "whales" until they form two large separate bundles.
The "estera" or skin of the boat is the next phase and is made by weaving the best stock of the reeds, made the length of the boat. This skin is wrapped around the two large bundles. A heart, or third bundle is placed in the center of the much larger bundles. Two strands of sisal rope, each 2250 feet in length is than passed around one large bundle and around the heart in one foot revolutions for the entire length. The same is done on the other side.  Never does the rope wrap around the whole ship.

The rope tightening is next. A pulley system is used to haul on the boats to get them gradually tighter. There are only two long continuous ropes, 2,250 feet on either side. The pulling begins on one end and is hauled on until taut. The ropes are pulled roughly thirty more times on each side, shrinking the size of the boat each time. This ingenious design now consists of two large bundles linked together by a heart that has now disappeared into the larger two bundles forming a stable, almost double-hulled vessel.
The next phase is to build up the bow and stern. Tapering cones of reeds are wedged together until a high bow and double stern are formed. The double stern adds more stability and carrying capacity to the ship while at sea.

Attaching the two large bundles that form the gunnels or "sawi" is the last step of the hull construction. Rope is wound around each gunnel and passed through each main bundle rope along the length of the ship. The rigging will be attached here and the gunnels help break the larger waves.

The crew and volunteers constructed the rest of the vessel. Two bipod masts were positioned on either side of a bamboo cabin for Viracocha I and a smaller mast was utilized further aft for the Viracocha II. The masts were held in place by "shoes" roped into the bundles. Two rudder oars were lashed to a steering platform placed above and to the rear of the bamboo cabin. The ship was rigged with natural fiber sisal rope, the same rope that holds the reed bundles together. Two center boards were positioned in the slide boxes placed in the fore and aft of the ship and aided in the tacking into the wind. Several lee-boards were placed on the lee-side of the ship and were removable. Two cotton lateen sails were hand-sewed for the first journey and five sails were used for the second.

The Viracocha III Expedition 

Fifteen years later, the Viracocha III reed raft was to attempt the complete crossing of the Pacific in February 2018. but the launch date was postponed for technical reasons. The expedition intended to follow the path of the Kon-Tiki Viracocha people and their impulse to follow the setting sun and desire to spread the seeds of civilization ever westward. Like the Virachocha I the Viracocha III was scheduled to sail from Arica, Chile, to Mangareva, in French Polynesia, and from there attempt to island-hop to Australia. As recounted by Youtuber Maks Ukraniets who recorded the entire expedition in his video, the journey ended after 109 days when the crew had to abandon ship 85 miles from Tahiti, when they were rescued by a passing cargo boat.

References 

Sailing expeditions